is the ninth official game in the Touhou Project scrolling shoot 'em up series. It is often abbreviated as PoFV in English speaking circles. Phantasmagoria of Flower View, like the third Touhou game, Phantasmagoria of Dim. Dream, differs from other games in the series in that two characters fight each other simultaneously, creating danmaku to try and defeat the other player. In this regard, the gameplay most resembles Twinkle Star Sprites by ADK.

Gameplay 

Phantasmagoria of Flower View is a split-screen vertically scrolling shoot 'em up game in which two players use attacks to defend themselves from enemies that will release bullets in their direction, and can, under certain conditions, release spell cards onto the opponent's screen. Unlike most Touhou games, in Phantsamagoria of Flower View, the player has a health bar, allowing them to survive multiple hits, and each stage ends when one player depletes their opponent's health.

The game features a Story Mode, wherein the player will fight a total of nine increasingly difficult opponents. After a one credit clear, the Extra Mode is unlocked, containing a single stage, which is considerably more difficult, and only gives the player a single life. In the game's Match Mode, the player can fight an opponent in a single stage, controlled either by the AI, or human opponents, locally or through the Internet.

Plot 
Spring has arrived in the oriental enclave of Gensokyo, but this year's spring is just too strong to believe. Every plant is in full bloom, even out-of-season flowers and bamboo trees, and consequently the fairies and creatures are becoming hyperactive. This completely unnatural spring prompted the heroines to set out, either to try to find out the reason behind the hyperactive spring, or just to wander around for lack of better things to do.

The incident, as it turns out, is a natural occurrence that happens once every sixty years, or one sexagenary cycle. Once every sixty years, something major happens in the outside world and fills Gensokyo with ghosts, who then infest flowers and make them bloom all over. Right from the beginning, it is not a cause of concern at all.

Characters

A total of 16 characters are available to play, among them: all are playable in the Match Mode, 14 are playable in the Story Mode, and 14 are playable in the Extra Mode.

: The miko of the Hakurei Shrine. She goes out to investigate the massive blooming of flowers, thinking that if she doesn't do something about it, others will think she's slacking, since it's her duty to solve these problems.
: An ordinary magician. She sets out to find out about the flowers simply because she is bored.
: The maid of the Scarlet Devil Mansion. She didn't sense any danger with the flowers, so she collects tea along with her investigation.
: A half-ghost from the Netherworld. The ghost princess of the Netherworld, Yuyuko, wasn't interested in investigating the flower outbreak, so Youmu goes off on her own.
: A rabbit from the moon who now resides in Eientei. The rabbits of Eientei became restless because of the blooming flowers, so Reisen decides to investigate, and on the way tries to look for Tei, who went missing.
: An ice fairy of the lake by the Scarlet Devil Mansion. Since the flowers are making the fairies excited, she sets out to enjoy herself amid the excitement. In the manual of the game, ZUN labelled her as "⑨ Idiot" (⑨バカ, baka) in a screenshot. Since then, the symbol ⑨ (pronounced "marukyū" in Japanese or "nineball" in English) gained notoriety as a shorthand for Cirno and "idiot" in the Touhou fandom.
: The keyboardist of the Prismriver Sisters. She splits off from her sisters to go solo, and sets off to gather musical inspiration during the flower outbreak.
: The trumpeter of the Prismriver Sisters, who has no interest in the flower outbreak. Playable only in the Match Play Mode.
: The violinist of the Prismriver Sisters, who has no interest in the flower outbreak. Playable only in the Match Play Mode.
: A night sparrow who loves to sing. This time she just wants to find a place to make music.
: The leader of the rabbits in Eientei. The rabbits grew excited with the flowers, Tei included, and she went out to play without telling anyone. In later games, her name is spelled Tewi.
: A reporter in the tengu society, she writes for her own newspaper, the Bunbunmaru Shinbun (文々。新聞) (sentence sentence period newspaper). Thinking that the flowering incident would bring a scoop, she goes to stalk potential news makers. Although this is her first game appearance, she was first introduced as the main character of the official Touhou fanbook Bohemian Archive in Japanese Red, which was published shortly before this game was released. In later games, her name is spelled Shameimaru.
: An abandoned doll who gained free will over the years due to exposure from the lily-of-the-valleys. The massive blooming strengthened the poison in the lily-of-the-valleys, prompting Medicine to test the poisonous power she wields on whomever she comes across.
: A yōkai with the power to manipulate flowers, returning with a new design and a new surname since her appearance in Lotus Land Story, released for the PC-98. Although the flowering incident isn't her doing, she became the prime suspect.
: A shinigami who was supposed to ferry dead spirits across the Sanzu River, but her slacking off made the already abundant spirits reside in the flowers of Gensokyo, causing the massive blooming incident. Playable in the Extra Mode and the Match Play Mode.
: The Yama responsible for judging the dead of Gensokyo, reflected in her title Yamaxanadu, or "Yama of Xanadu". Dead spirits aren't coming across the Sanzu River, so she goes to check on her subordinate Komachi. She also takes this opportunity to lecture whoever that heads her way on their various faults. Playable in the Extra Mode and the Match Play Mode.

Development
ZUN, the sole member of the developer Team Shanghai Alice, originally did not plan to make a game for Summer 2005; however, he changed his mind when he realized 2005 marked the tenth anniversary of the Touhou Project, and decided to make a fanservice-type game to mark the occasion. He believed that, in a game, the best kind of fanservice is to pit players against each other so they can have a chance to meet, and so tournaments can happen and so on. In this spirit, ZUN adapted the system used by Twinkle Star Sprites to create a versus shooter, with the focus on dodging bullets (like other Touhou games) instead of shooting each other down. Though ZUN usually develops his games alone, alphes from the circle Twilight Frontier is listed as a "Graphics Helper" in this game.

After releasing the game in the 68th Comiket, ZUN worked on a netplay patch to support online multiplayer, and released the patch in October 2005. The patch was not without its problems, as online games were often unsynchronized and unstable. However, a year later ZUN announced that he will not continue making patches to enhance PoFV's netplay because he wanted to move forward.

ZUN had also written a short spin-off story to PoFV named , included in the fanbook Seasonal Dream Vision, featuring Yukari Yakumo as its main character.

Phantasmagoria of Flower View was released on Steam on April 25, 2022. The release supports Steam's "Remote Play Together" feature for online multiplayer. This makes it the only game from Touhou's "Windows Generation No. 1" currently available for purchase, as the source code of other games, previously Phantasmagoria itself, are believed to be lost.

Notes

References

External links
Phantasmagoria of Flower View: Official Site
Phantasmagoria of Flower View on Touhou Wiki

2005 video games
Touhou Project games
Multiplayer and single-player video games
Bullet hell video games
Shoot 'em ups
Scrolling shooters
Video games developed in Japan
Windows games
Windows-only games